The 2022–23 Norwegian Football Cup is the 116th season of the Norwegian annual knock-out football tournament. The first round was played in May 2022. The final will be played on 20 May 2023.

Calendar
Below are the dates for each round as given by the official schedule:

Source:

First round
The pair-ups for the first round were announced on 7 April 2022.

Second round
The pair-ups for the second round were announced on 23 May 2022.

Third round
The draw for the third round was made on 23 June 2022. All the matches were set to be played on 29 and 30 June, but three of them were postponed due to flight cancellations caused by an airline strike.

Fourth round
The draw for the fourth round was made on 24 August 2022.

Quarter-finals
The draw for the quarter-finals was made on 19 January 2023.

Semi-finals
The draw for the semi-finals was made on 19 January 2023.

Top scorers

Notes

References

Norwegian Football Cup seasons
Norwegian Football Cup
Football Cup
Football Cup
Norway